Shageluk is a city in Yukon-Koyukuk Census Area, Alaska, United States. At the 2010 census the population was 83, down from 129 in 2000.

Geography
Shageluk is located at  (62.655998, -159.531132).

Demographics

Shageluk first appeared on the 1880 U.S. Census as the center of an unincorporated area called "Chageluk Settlements." It reported 150 residents, all of the Tinneh tribe. It would not report again on the census until 1920, when Shageluk appeared separately as an unincorporated village. In 1966, the village relocated 2 miles south to higher ground because of flooding and rebuilt. It formally incorporated in 1970. The old townsite is within the present city boundaries.

As of the census of 2000, there were 129 people, 36 households, and 29 families residing in the city. The population density was 12.2 people per square mile (4.7/km2). There were 52 housing units at an average density of 4.9 per square mile (1.9/km2). The racial makeup of the city was 3.10% White and 96.90% Native American.

There were 36 households, out of which 44.4% had children under the age of 18 living with them, 33.3% were married couples living together, 33.3% had a female householder with no husband present, and 16.7% were non-families. 16.7% of all households were made up of individuals, and none had someone living alone who was 65 years of age or older. The average household size was 3.58 and the average family size was 3.83.

In the city, the age distribution of the population shows 42.6% under the age of 18, 7.0% from 18 to 24, 25.6% from 25 to 44, 14.7% from 45 to 64, and 10.1% who were 65 years of age or older. The median age was 26 years. For every 100 females, there were 108.1 males. For every 100 females age 18 and over, there were 124.2 males.

The median income for a household in the city was $26,667, and the median income for a family was $24,000. Males had a median income of $11,250 versus $22,083 for females. The per capita income for the city was $7,587.

Transportation 
It is served by the Shageluk Airport.

Education
The Iditarod Area School District operates the Innoko River School in Shageluk.

References

Cities in Alaska
Cities in Yukon–Koyukuk Census Area, Alaska
Deg Xitʼan